MEmphis Rock and Soul is a 2016 studio album by American rock musician Melissa Etheridge. The collection of soul covers has received positive critical reception.

Recording and release
Etheridge wanted to record an album of songs in Memphis and from the Stax Records catalog that inspired her as a child growing up in Kansas, specifically in historic Memphis studios with recordings that included her own sound while being faithful to the original versions. Etheridge additionally recruited some of the original artists who recorded the initial songs and even used Al Green's microphone to record her vocals. The album was preceded by a music video for her cover of Sam and Dave's "Hold On, I’m Coming".

The spelling of the title with "MEmphis" represents Etheridge's initials.

Reception
Editors at AllMusic Guide rated this album three out of five stars, with reviewer Stephen Thomas Erlewine characterizing the covers as "faithful and loving to the original versions, preserving the arrangements but sometimes allowing the band to vamp a bit", noting that "her affection for both the songs and sound of Southern soul in the '60s is evident". Lee Zimmerman of Glide Magazine scored this album a nine out of 10, writing "there’s no pomp or pretension needed; Etheridge revels in her own edge and authority, thereby making these songs an ideal match for a style that’s always been borne by a certain soulful edge to begin with". Hal Horowitz of American Songwriter rated MEmphis Rock and Soul four out of five stars and also noted the natural fit between this genre and Etheridge's style, noting that the music "leaves you with an appreciation that Etheridge loves and cares about the music and is determined to do it justice". PopMatters' Colin McGuire gave the album a five out of 10, calling out several tracks as weaker than the originals and assessing that her vocals don't "match the amount or the type that it takes to successfully embody these songs" leaving the album "a soul record that lacks soul".

Track listing
"Memphis Train" (Mack Rice, Willie Sparks, and Rufus Thomas) – 3:50
"Respect Yourself (People Stand Up)" (Melissa Etheridge, Luther Ingram, Priscilla Renae, and Mack Rice) – 4:25
"Who’s Making Love" (Homer Banks, Bettye Crutcher, Don Davis, and Raymond Jackson) – 3:51
"Hold On, I’m Coming" (Isaac Hayes and David Porter) – 3:23
"I’ve Been Loving You Too Long (to Stop Now)" (Jerry Butler and Otis Redding) – 4:05
"Any Other Way" (William Bell) – 3:24
"I’m a Lover" (John Burk, Lowell Fulsom, Melissa Etheridge, and Jimmy McCracklin) – 3:06
"Rock Me Baby" (Joe Josea and B. B. King) – 4:47
"I Forgot to Be Your Lover" (William Bell and Booker T. Jones) – 4:52
"Wait a Minute" (Barbara Stephens) – 2:55
"Born Under a Bad Sign" (Jones) – 4:36
"I’ve Got Dreams to Remember" (Otis Redding and Zelma Redding) – 4:34
Deluxe edition bonus tracks
"Your Good Thing (Is About to End)" (Isaac Hayes and David Porter) – 4:33
"I Know a Place (I’ll Take You There)" (Al Bell) – 3:03
"These Arms of Mine" (Otis Redding) – 3:49

Personnel
Melissa Etheridge – guitar, vocals, production
Paul Blakemore – mastering
Stefanie Bolton – backing vocals
John Burk – production, executive production
Yennifer Correia – violin
Michael Fahey – mixing assistance
Theron Feemster – programming
Marc Franklin – trumpet
Charles Hodges – organ
Leroy Hodges – bass guitar
Jonathan Kirkscey – cello
Beth Luscombe – viola
John Mayer – lead guitar on "Rock Me Baby" and "Born Under a Bad Sign"
Lannie McMillan – saxophone
Lawrence "Boo" Mitchell – recording at Royal Studios
Jessie Munson – violin
Sharisse Norman – backing vocals
Seth Presant – recording at The Village Studios
Vance Powell – mixing at Sputnik Sound
Candice Rayburn-Marshall – backing vocals
James Robertson – drums
Myriam Santos – photography
Carrie Smith – art direction, design
Kirk Smothers – baritone saxophone
Lester Snell – horn arrangement on "I've Been Loving You Too Long (to Stop Now)", string arrangement on "I've Been Loving You Too Long (to Stop Now)" and "I Forgot to Be Your Lover"
Jim Spake – tenor saxophone
Michael Toles – guitar
Archie Turner – keyboards

See also
List of 2016 albums

References

External links

Melissa Etheridge: 5 Songs to Heal a Broken Heart from Rolling Stone

2016 albums
Covers albums
Melissa Etheridge albums
Soul albums by American artists
Stax Records albums